Yakut , also known as Yakutian, Sakha, Saqa or Saxa, is a Turkic language spoken by around 450,000 native speakers, primarily the ethnic Yakuts and one of the official languages of Sakha (Yakutia), a federal republic in the Russian Federation.

The Yakut language differs from all other Turkic languages in the presence of a layer of vocabulary of unclear origin (possibly Paleo-Siberian). There is also a large number of words of Mongolian origin related to ancient borrowings, as well as numerous recent borrowings from Russian. Like other Turkic languages and their ancestor Proto-Turkic, Yakut is an agglutinative language and features vowel harmony.

Classification
Yakut is a member of the Northeastern Common Turkic family of languages, which also includes Shor, Tuvan and Dolgan. Like most Turkic languages, Yakut has vowel harmony, is agglutinative and has no grammatical gender. Word order is usually subject–object–verb. Yakut has been influenced by Tungusic and Mongolian languages.

Historically, Yakut left the community of Common Turkic speakers relatively early.  Due to this, it diverges in many ways from other Turkic languages and mutual intelligibility between Yakut and other Turkic languages is low.  Nevertheless, Yakut contains many features which are important for the reconstruction of Proto-Turkic, such as the preservation of long vowels.

Geographic distribution
Yakut is spoken mainly in the Sakha Republic. It is also used by ethnic Yakuts in Khabarovsk Region and a small diaspora in other parts of the Russian Federation, Turkey, and other parts of the world. Dolgan, a close relative of Yakut, considered by some a dialect of Yakut, is spoken by Dolgans in Krasnoyarsk Region. Yakut is widely used as a lingua franca by other ethnic minorities in the Sakha Republic – more Dolgans, Evenks, Evens and Yukagirs speak Yakut than their own languages. About 8% of the people of other ethnicities than Yakut living in Sakha claimed knowledge of the Yakut language during the 2002 census.

Phonology

Consonants
Yakut has the following consonants phonemes, where the IPA value is provided in slashes '//' and the native script value is provided in bold followed by the romanization in parentheses.

  are laminal denti-alveolar , whereas  are alveolar .
Thus айыы can be ayïï  'deed, creation, work' or aỹïï  'sin, transgression.' The nasal glide  has a very restricted distribution, appearing in very few words.
  is pronounced as a flap  between vowels, e.g. орон (oron)   'place', and as a trill at the end of words, e.g. тур (tur)  'stand'.
  does not occur at the beginning of words in native Yakut words; borrowed Russian words with onset  are usually rendered with an epenthetic vowel, e.g. Russian рама (rama) > Yakut араама (araama) 'frame'.

Yakut is in many ways phonologically unique among the Turkic languages.  Yakut and the closely related Dolgan language are the only Turkic languages without hushing sibilants.  Additionally, no known Turkic languages other than Yakut and Khorasani Turkic have the palatal nasal .

Consonant assimilation 

Consonants at morpheme boundaries undergo extensive assimilation, both progressive and regressive. All suffixes possess numerous allomorphs. For suffixes which begin with a consonant, the surface form of the consonant is conditioned on the stem-final segment.  There are four such archiphonemic consonants: G, B, T, and L.  Examples of each are provided in the following table for the suffixes -GIt (second-person plural possessive suffix, oɣoɣut 'y'all's child'), -BIt (first-person plural possessive suffix, oɣobut, 'our child'), -TA (partitive case suffix,  'some teeth'), -LARA (third-person plural possessive suffix, oɣoloro 'their child').  Note that the alternation in the vowels is governed by vowel harmony (see the main article and the below section).

 
There is an additional regular morphophonological pattern for -final stems: they assimilate in place of articulation with an immediately following labial or velar.  For example at 'horse' > akkït 'y'all's horse', > appït 'our horse'.

Debuccalization 

Yakut initial s- corresponds to initial h- in Dolgan and played an important operative rule in the development of proto-Yakut, ultimately resulting in initial Ø- < *h- < *s- (example: Dolgan huoq and Yakut suox, both meaning "not"). The historical change of *s > h, known as debuccalization, is a common sound-change across the world's languages, being characteristic of such languages as Greek and Indo-Iranian in their development from Proto-Indo-European, as well as such Turkic languages as Bashkir, e.g. höt 'milk' < *süt. Debuccalization of /s/ to /h/ is also found as a diachronic change from Proto-Celtic to Brittonic, and has actually become a synchronic grammaticalised feature called lenition in the related Goidelic languages (Irish, Scottish, and Manx).

Debuccalization is also an active phonological process in modern Yakut.  Intervocalically the phoneme  becomes .  For example the /s/ in кыыс (kïïs) 'girl' becomes [h] between vowels:

Vowels

Yakut has twenty phonemic vowels: eight short vowels, eight long vowels, and four diphthongs. The following table give broad transcriptions for each vowel phoneme, as well as the native script bold and romanization in italics:

Vowel harmony 

Like other Turkic languages, a characteristic feature of Yakut is progressive vowel harmony.  Most root words obey vowel harmony, for example in кэлин (kelin) 'back', all the vowels are front and unrounded.  Yakut's vowel harmony in suffixes is the most complex system in the Turkic family.  Vowel harmony is an assimilation process where vowels in one syllable take on certain features of vowels in the preceding syllable. In Yakut, subsequent vowels all take on frontness and all non-low vowels take on lip rounding of preceding syllables' vowels.  There are two main rules of vowel harmony:

 Frontness/backness harmony:
  Front vowels are always followed by front vowels.
  Back vowels are always followed by back vowels.
 Rounding harmony:
 Unrounded vowels are always followed by unrounded vowels.
 Close rounded vowels always occur after close rounded vowels. 
 Open unrounded vowels do not assimilate in rounding with close rounded vowels.

The quality of the diphthongs /ie, ïa, uo, üö/ for the purposes of vowel harmony is determined by the first segment in the diphthong.  Taken together, these rules mean that the pattern of subsequent syllables in Yakut is entirely predictable, and all words will follow the following pattern:  Like the consonant assimilation rules above, suffixes display numerous allomorphs determined by the stem they attach to.  There are two archiphoneme vowels I (an underlyingly high vowel) and A (an underlyingly low vowel).

Examples of I can be seen in the first-person singular possessive agreement suffix -(I)m: as in (a):

The underlyingly low vowel phoneme A is represented through the third-person singular agreement suffix -(t)A in (b):

Orthography

After three earlier phases of development, Yakut is currently written using the Cyrillic script: the modern Yakut alphabet, established in 1939 by the Soviet Union, consists of all the Russian characters with five additional letters for phonemes not present in Russian:  Ҕҕ, Ҥҥ, Өө, Һһ, Үү, as follows:

Long vowels are represented through the doubling of vowels, e.g. үүт (üüt) // 'milk,' a practice that many scholars follow in Romanizations of the language.

The full Yakut alphabet contains letters for consonant phonemes not present in native words (and thus not indicated in the phonology tables above): the letters В , Е //, Ё /|/, Ж , З , Ф , Ц , Ш , Щ , Ъ, Ю //, Я // are used exclusively in Russian loanwords.

Transliteration

There are numerous conventions for the Romanization of Yakut.  Bibliographic sources and libraries typically use the  ALA-LC Romanization tables for non-Slavic languages in Cyrillic script.  Linguists often employ Turkological standards for transliteration, or a mixture of Turkological standards and the IPA.  In addition, others employ Turkish orthography.  Comparison of some of these systems can be seen in the following:

Grammar

Syntax
The typical word order can be summarized as subject – adverb – object – verb; possessor – possessed; adjective – noun.

Nouns
Nouns have plural and singular forms. The plural is formed with the suffix /-LAr/, which may surface as -лар (-lar), -лэр (-ler), -лөр (-lör), -лор (-lor), -тар (-tar), -тэр (-ter), -төр (-tör), -тор (-tor), -дар (-dar), -дэр (-der), -дөр (-dör), -дор (-dor), -нар (-nar), -нэр (-ner), -нөр (-nör), or -нор (-nor), depending on the preceding consonants and vowels. The plural is used only when referring to a number of things collectively, not when specifying an amount. Nouns have no gender.

There is a handful of irregular plural nouns, e.g.  'boy; son' > ,  'girl; daughter' > .

Yakut has eight grammatical cases: nominative (unmarked), accusative -(n)I, dative -GA, partitive -TA, ablative -(t)tan, instrumental -(I)nAn, comitative -LIIn, and comparative -TAAɣAr.  Examples of these are shown in the following table for a vowel-final stem  'peace' and a consonant-final stem  'fire':

A notable detail about Yakut case is the absence of the genitive, a feature which some argue is due to historical contact with Tungusic languages. Possessors are unmarked, with the possessive relationship only being realized on the possessive suffix on the possessed noun.  For example, in (a) the first-person pronouns are not marked for genitive case; neither do full nominal possessors receive any marking (b):

Pronouns
Personal pronouns in Yakut distinguish between first, second, and third persons and singular and plural number.

Questions
Question words in Yakut remain in-situ; they do not move to the front of the sentence.  Sample question words include:  'what',  'who',  'how',  'how much; how many',  'where', and  'which'.

Vocabulary

Numerals

Oral and written literature

The Yakut have a tradition of oral epic in their language called "Olonkho", traditionally performed by skilled performers. The subject matter is based on Yakut mythology and legends. Versions of many Olonkho poems have been written down and translated since the 19th century, but only a very few older performers of the oral Olonkho tradition are still alive. They have begun a program to teach young people to sing this in their language and revive it, though in a modified form.

The first printing in Yakut was a part of a book by Nicolaas Witsen published in 1692 in Amsterdam.

In 2005, Marianne Beerle-Moor, director of the Institute for Bible Translation, Russia/CIS, was awarded the Order of Civil Valour by the Republic of Sakha (Yakutia) for the translation of the New Testament into Yakut.

Examples 
Article 1 of Universal Declaration of Human Rights:

See also

Yakuts
Dolgan language
Semyon Novgorodov – the inventor of the first IPA-based Yakut alphabet

References

Bibliography
 
  (in Russian)
 
 
 
  
  (in Turkish)

External links

Language-related
Yakut Vocabulary List (from the World Loanword Database)
Yakut thematic vocabulary lists

Yakut texts with Russian translations in the Internet Archive – heroic poetry, fairy tales, legends, proverbs, etc.
Sakhalyy suruk – Yakut Unicode fonts and Keyboard Layouts for PC
Sakhatyla.ru – On-line Yakut–Russian, Russian–Yakut dictionary
Yakut–English Dictionary 
BGN/PCGN romanization tool for Yakut
Sakha Open World  – MP3's of Sakha Radio

Content in Yakut
Sakha Open World – Орто Дойду  – A platform to promote the Yakut Language on the web; News, Lyrics, Music, Fonts, Forum, VideoNews (in Yakut, Unicode)
Baayaga village website – news and stories about and by the people of Baayaga (in Yakut)
Kyym.ru – site of Yakut newspaper
НВК Саха (NVK Sakha) Yakut language news channel on YouTube

 
Agglutinative languages
Siberian Turkic languages
Vowel-harmony languages
Languages of Russia
Turkic languages